Dhoni is a 2012 Indian drama film co-written, directed and produced by Prakash Raj. Simultaneously made in Tamil and Telugu languages, it stars Raj alongside Aakash and Radhika Apte. The plot illustrates the conflicting interests of a father and his son; the father wants his son to study MBA, but his son is more interested in sports and wants to become a famous cricketer like Mahendra Singh Dhoni. Based on the Marathi film Shikshanachya Aaicha Gho by Mahesh Manjrekar, Dhoni released on 10 February 2012 to positive reviews.

Plot
Subramaniam is a lower-middle-class widower with two kids. He works from dawn to dusk to bring up his daughter Kaveri and son Karthik. He wishes to give them a good education. He wants to see his son become an MBA graduate. But his son not interested in studies. Fourteen-year-old Karthik wants to become a good cricketer. His inspiration is Mahendra Singh Dhoni and like him, he wants to be an attacking wicketkeeper-batsman.

While Subramaniam enrolls him in a good school, Karthik fails in most of the subjects. However, his cricket coach is in all praise, as Karthik played a major role in winning a cricket tournament. Kaveri often spends time with Nalini. Subramaniam learns that Nalini earns her living through prostitution and strictly orders his daughter to stay away from her. As Karthik is poor in studies, the principal tells Subramaniam to take his son out.

Immediately Subramaniam takes Karthik away from cricket coaching and makes him to go a series of tuition classes. Karthik fails to cope with his studies even after leaving cricket, which makes Subramaniam lose his patience. He beats him and injures his head by mistake for which he is arrested. As Karthik goes into a coma, Subramaniam is very upset. He thanks Nalini for helping him pay the hospital bill.

When Subramaniam goes to his school to collect things from Karthik's locker, he finds many trophies and certificates which makes him argue with the teacher that if his son is not good at studies it does not mean that he is good for nothing. Soon he goes for TV shows to debate. As he is working in a government office they ban him from going to the office and cancel the loan for his son's operation. Subramaniam cannot bear it anymore and he goes to a function where the chief minister comes, he talks with the minister about all this. The minister promises him that there will be changes and he will get the money for his son's operation. Karthik's operation is successfully done. Karthik plays the final tournament in his school he hits the last ball which goes for a six and he wins the match. The movie ends as his coach and Subramaniam carry him.

Cast

Production
Prakash Raj announced that he would direct a bilingual named Dhoni. He said: "The film deals with the pressure that children undergo these days in schools".

Mumbai-based model-actor Mugdha Godse was reported to have been signed on to essay the opposite lead role, while Ilaiyaraaja was roped in to do the musical honors. Radhika Apte confirmed that she was playing a pivotal role in the film. Telugu film director Puri Jagannadh's son Aakash was selected to portray Prakash Raj's son.

The first look of the film was unveiled in August 2011.

In November 2011, choreographer-actor Prabhu Deva shot for five days for a cameo role.

Reception

Critical response
Dhoni received a positive response from critics. The Times of India rated it 3.5 out of 5, saying, "...thanks to a combination of inspired acting, stimulating writing, a stirring background score and fine camera work, the film rises above the ordinary to make for a compelling cinema experience." Oneindia praised Prakash Raj's "electrifying performance", as well as his directorial abilities. Rohit Ramachandran of Nowrunning.com gave the movie 2.5 stars out of 5, stating, "Instead of reaching the potent climax that the film had set itself up for or giving its characters the opportunity to evolve, Dhoni becomes a social statement we've heard before."

fullhyd.com praised Dhonis middle-class touches, and said it has "Prakash Raj written all over it — the man coats his film with the intensity and integrity we're used to seeing in his performances". It also said that some of the film's outrage is off-topic. Sunita Chowdary of Cinegoer.com, said that Dhoni is "a perfect picture of hope and redemption", but added that the film is predictable.

Soundtrack

The soundtrack and background score were composed by Ilaiyaraaja. The album was released on 28 January 2012 with a special live performance by Ilaiyaraaja. Behindwoods reported that the music was a "treat for Raja fanatics" and that the emphasis on melody was "there all through".

Tamil version

All lyrics were written by Na. Muthukumar.

Telugu version
All the songs were written by Sirivennela Sitarama Sastry.

Awards

References

External links
 

2012 films
Films about cricket in India
Films about the education system in India
Films scored by Ilaiyaraaja
2010s Tamil-language films
2010s Telugu-language films
Indian multilingual films
2012 drama films
Telugu remakes of Marathi films
Tamil remakes of Marathi films
Indian children's drama films
2010s children's drama films
2012 multilingual films